Guangzhounan (Guangzhou South) railway station is located in Shibi, Panyu District, Guangzhou, Guangdong Province, China. For a brief time it was Asia's largest railway station by area when it officially started operation in early 2010.

The station, designed by TFP Farrells, remains the largest in Guangzhou. It is one of the four largest railway passenger transportation hubs in China. It is an interchange station and a terminus between the Guangzhou-Shenzhen-Hong Kong XRL, Guangzhou-Maoming Railway, Guangzhou–Zhuhai intercity railway and Beijing-Guangzhou HSR. This station is intended to replace the existing Guangzhou railway station as the dominant station in Guangzhou. Together with Guangzhou railway station, Guangzhou East and Guangzhou North railway stations, the station will jointly form one of six planned National Railway Passenger Transportation Centres by the Chinese Ministry of Railways.

History 
 30 December 2004 – Construction commences
 30 January 2010 – Partial opening of the station with services north to Wuhan
 25 September 2010 – Metro station opened
 7 January 2011 – Services to Zhuhai North and Xinhui commences
 26 December 2011 – Service to Shenzhen North commences
 26 December 2012 – Service to Beijing West commences
 26 December 2014 – Services to Nanning East and Guiyang North commences
 30 December 2015 – Services to Futian commences
 23 September 2018 – Service to Hong Kong West Kowloon commences

Interchanges 
Guangzhou South railway station is also a comprehensive transportation hub; passengers can interchange between high-speed long-distance trains, Metro, long-distance and local buses, taxi, etc. Guangzhou Metro Line 2, Line 7 and Line 22 and Foshan Metro Line 2 are located at or near the bottom of station complex. The formation of a centralized transfer center will see connections with the future Guangzhou Metro Line 20.

Panyu railway station operated by Guangdong Intercity is under construction and will be situated underneath Guangzhou South, allowing for transfer between the two stations.

See also 
 Guangzhou–Shenzhen–Hong Kong Express Rail Link

Adjacent stations

References 

Railway stations in Guangzhou
Railway stations in China opened in 2010
Guangzhou Metro stations in Panyu District
Panyu District